Robert Milacki (born July 28, 1964) is a former professional baseball player who pitched in Major League Baseball between  and , mostly with the Baltimore Orioles.

Playing career
He started three games as a September call-up in 1988, allowing only 2 runs and 9 hits in 25 innings. In his rookie season of 1989, Milacki led the American League with 36 games started, posting a 14–12 record with a career-best 3.74 ERA.

On April 23, 1989, Milacki pitched a rare complete game shutout against the Minnesota Twins in which he faced the minimum 27 batters; he allowed 3 hits and 2 walks.

On July 13, 1991, the Orioles defeated the Oakland A's 2–0 on a combined no-hitter.  Milacki pitched the first six innings of the game, with no runs on no hits, three walks and three strikeouts.  He was pulled from the game after a line drive struck him on the arm, despite the batter being retired when the ball bounced towards first base.  Mike Flanagan, Mark Williamson, and Gregg Olson each followed up with a no-hit scoreless inning to complete the no-hitter.

After posting a 6–8 record for the Orioles in 1992, Milacki became a free agent.  He pitched a combined 22 games with the Indians, Royals, and Mariners through the 1996 season. In 1997, he pitched in six games for the Kintetsu Buffaloes in Japan.

Post-playing career 
Since 2001, Milacki has been a minor league pitching coach in several organizations:
 2001: Hickory Crawdads, Low-A affiliate of the Texas Rangers
 2002: Altoona Curve, AA affiliate of the Pittsburgh Pirates
 2003-2004: Hickory Crawdads, Low-A affiliate of the Texas Rangers
 2005-2008: Lynchburg Hillcats, High-A affiliate of the Pittsburgh Pirates
 2009: Lakewood BlueClaws, Low-A affiliate of the Philadelphia Phillies
 2010-2012: Reading Phillies, AA affiliate of the Philadelphia Phillies
 2013-2014: Clearwater Threshers, High-A affiliate of the Philadelphia Phillies
 2015-2017: Syracuse Chiefs, AAA affiliate of the Washington Nationals
 2018: Carolina Mudcats, High-A affiliate of the Milwaukee Brewers
2019: Biloxi Shuckers, AA affiliate of the Milwaukee Brewers
2021: Idaho Falls Chukars, members of the Pioneer League, an independent professional baseball league.

Personal life
Milacki was born in Trenton, New Jersey, and grew up in Lake Havasu City, Arizona.  He graduated from Lake Havasu High School in 1982 and attended Yavapai Community College.
Milacki and his wife Kim have two daughters, Brittany and Ashlee, and a son, Robert. Ashlee played college basketball for Glendale Community College. Robert was drafted as a pitcher in the 38th round (1151st pick) by the Washington Nationals in the 2018 baseball season.

References

External links

Bob Milacki at SABR (Baseball BioProject)

1964 births
Living people
American expatriate baseball players in Japan
American people of Polish descent
Baltimore Orioles players
Baseball players from Trenton, New Jersey
Charlotte Knights players
Charlotte O's players
Cleveland Indians players
Daytona Beach Admirals players
Hagerstown Suns players
Kansas City Royals players
Kintetsu Buffaloes players
Major League Baseball pitchers
Miami Marlins (FSL) players
Minor league baseball coaches
Nashville Sounds players
New Orleans Zephyrs players
Omaha Royals players
People from Lake Havasu City, Arizona
Rochester Red Wings players
Seattle Mariners players
St. Paul Saints players
Syracuse Chiefs coaches
Tacoma Rainiers players
Yavapai Roughriders baseball players